Connie Han (born 4 February 1996) is an American jazz pianist. She has recorded three albums for Mack Avenue Records.

Early life
Han was born in Los Angeles, California to Chinese parents, both of whom were professional musicians. She was taught piano from the age of five, initially by her mother. She became interested in jazz in high school, where she was taught by drummer Bill Wysaske. Han opted not to study music in college, and became a professional musician at the age of 17, with Wysaske as her trio's musical director.

Later life and career
Wysaske produced Han's debut album, The Richard Rodgers Songbook, which was self-released in 2015. She subsequently signed to Mack Avenue Records, which released her Crime Zone in 2018. Han wrote seven of the album's ten tracks. The album included Wysaske and Edwin Livingston (bass) and the guest musicians Walter Smith III (saxophone) and Brian Swartz (trumpet). The title track is inspired by films like Blade Runner and the anime movie Akira.

In 2019, Han was named a Steinway Artist. In the same year, JAZZIZ magazine featured Han in "The Shape of Jazz to Come: Artists to Watch in 2019", claiming that Han embodies her primary jazz influences McCoy Tyner, Chick Corea, Herbie Hancock and Kenny Kirkland "in way of spirit and energy, not mere reproduction." Her original compositions from Crime Zone "were firmly stamped with her own artistic vision, and it's a vision that she will certainly continue to expand through 2019 and beyond."

Composing and playing style
The DownBeat reviewer of Crime Zone described Han's compositions on the album as having "angular melodies and odd, abruptly shifting meters".

The DownBeat reviewer of Iron Starlet wrote that, compared with Han's piano playing on the album, on Fender Rhodes "her approach to the music shifts considerably. The emphasis turns to repeating melodic phrases and finding the right glassy tones to apply".

Discography

References

External links
 
 

1996 births
Living people
American jazz pianists
21st-century American women pianists
21st-century American pianists
Mack Avenue Records artists
American musicians of Chinese descent